Thabo Masunga Maruje is the current chief of Masunga village, who took the title from his uncle Christopher Masunga. Thabo is the son to the late Robert Masunga, who was the first chief to Masunga village.

Gallery of photos

References

Botswana chiefs
Botswana Christians
Year of birth missing (living people)
Living people
Place of birth missing (living people)